Dastak is a Hindi film made in 1970. It was written and directed by Rajinder Singh Bedi and was his directorial debut.

The film is known for its performances by its leading cast, Sanjeev Kumar, and the newcomer, Rehana Sultan, and for its memorable songs by Madan Mohan. He won his first National Film Award for it and the lyrics of Majrooh Sultanpuri. Hrishikesh Mukherjee, the film director-turned-editor of this black-and-white film and won a Filmfare Award, his second after Madhumati in 1958.

Awards
 1971 National Film Award for Best Actor - Sanjeev Kumar
 1971 National Film Award for Best Actress - Rehana Sultan
 1971 National Film Award for Best Music Direction - Madan Mohan 
 1972 Filmfare Best Cinematographer Award - (B&W) - Kamal Bose

Overview

Dastak presents an expanded version of Rajinder Singh Bedi's radio play, Naql-e-Makaani (Moving to a New House), first performed on All India Radio, Lahore in 1944.

Upon release, the film established Rajinder Singh Bedi as an important force in Indian Parallel Cinema, as Dastak is considered an important film of the decade. In 1972 the director was awarded the Padma Shri.

The director Hrishikesh Mukjherjee once said, "Rajinder Singh Bedi was an extraordinarily gifted writer. Indeed, I feel privileged that I could edit his maiden venture as writer-director 'Dastak' in stark B&W starring Sanjeev Kumar and Rehana Sultan. Rehana won the 'Urvashi' award then the term for the National Award for Best Actress and I won the coveted Filmfare award for my first love - editing!"

Critical reception

Dastak was featured in Avijit Ghosh's book, 40 Retakes: Bollywood Classics You May Have Missed.

Synopsis

The film was known for its unusual story line set in a red light area. A newlywed couple, Hamid (Sanjeev Kumar) and Salma (Rehana Sultan), unwittingly rent a flat, and thus begins their daily turmoil at the knocks (dastak) on their door. The previous occupant was Shamshad Begum (Shakeela), a mujrewali (nautch girl).

Cast
 Sanjeev Kumar as Hameed
 Rehana Sultan as Salma
 Anju Mahendru as Maria
 Shakeela as Shamshad
 Kamal Kapoor as Brijmohan
 Manmohan Krishna as Shahid
 Anwar Hussain as Marativale
 Dev Kishan as Mirza
 Niranjan Sharma
 Jagdev
 Yash Kumar

Music 
Dastak was released when the nation was gripped by the western rhythms prevalent in the music of music directors like R.D. Burman. The film's music director stood his ground as a maestro of classical rhythms on the dholak and raga based melodies. The music of Dastak stood out for its allegiance to the classical traditions of raga-based melodies by its music director Madan Mohan, who managed to get from Lata Mangeshkar, ostensibly her best performance as a playback singer.

Lyrics
The film is known for its poignant lyrics by lyricist Majrooh Sultanpuri, especially in capturing the painful state of the story's female protagonist, Salma — be it a dramatic statement about the society: "Hum hai mataye koocha bazaar ki tarah, Uthti hai har nigaah kharidaar ki tarah" or the silent pain of "Mai Ri mai ka se Kahoon peer apne jiya ki..."

Songs
 "Baiyan Na Dharo" - Lata Mangeshkar - (based on Raag Charukesi)
 "Hum Hain Mata-e-koocha-o-bazaar" - Lata Mangeshkar  
 "Mai Ri Main Kase Kahoon" – Lata Mangehskar/Madan Mohan
 "Tumse Kahoon Ek Baat" - Mohammed Rafi

References

External links
 
 Passion for Cinema-Dastak
 Dastak, an in-depth study

Films featuring a Best Actress National Award-winning performance
1970 films
Indian erotic drama films
1970s Hindi-language films
Indian black-and-white films
Films scored by Madan Mohan
Indian films based on plays
Films featuring a Best Actor National Award-winning performance
1970 directorial debut films
Films directed by Rajinder Singh Bedi